Jason Anthony Jolkowski (June 24, 1981disappeared June 13, 2001) is an American man from Omaha, Nebraska who went missing while walking towards his former high school to meet a co-worker for a ride to work. In the aftermath of his disappearance, Jolkowski's parents successfully campaigned for "Jason's Law", a statewide database for missing people in Nebraska. , Jolkowski's whereabouts remain unknown.

Background
Jason Jolkowski was born on June 24, 1981 in Grand Island, Nebraska. At the time he disappeared, Jolkowski was living in his parents' home on 48th and Bedford Street in the Benson neighborhood of Omaha. He was a part-time student in the radio broadcasting program at Iowa Western Community College in Council Bluffs, Iowa and worked at a local Fazoli's restaurant. It was reported that he planned to eventually become a radio DJ for KIWR. Jolkowski's mother described him as "shy", "a quiet boy" with only "a small handful of friends."

Disappearance
On Wednesday, June 13, 2001, Jolkowski was called into work early. Since Jolkowski had trouble giving directions, he arranged for them to meet at Benson High School, which he and his co-worker had previously attended. The school was eight blocks (about ) from his home.

At 10:45 a.m., Jolkowski was last seen by a neighbor, who witnessed him helping his younger brother pull trash cans from the curb back to the house. Under an hour later, between 11:15 and 11:30 a.m., his co-worker called his house stating that he had failed to turn up at Benson High for the ride to work. Jolkowski has not been seen or heard from since then. Shortly after his disappearance, the school's security cameras were checked, but none of them showed Jolkowski arriving at the school.

A police officer investigating his disappearance deemed it "the most baffling case" he had seen in thirty years. As of 2022, the Omaha Police Department continues to investigate the case.

Impact
Jolkowski's mother and father created Project Jason in his honor to help families through a loved one's disappearance. In 2005, after lobbying by his parents, "Jason's Law" was passed by Nebraska Legislature, providing for a statewide database on missing persons. Kelly Jolkowski, Jason's mother, later received a Volunteer for Victims award from U.S. Attorney General Eric Holder in 2010 and the Nebraska Governor's Points of Light Award in 2014 in recognition of her work to support families of missing people.

See also
List of people who disappeared

References

External links
 site archive at the Internet Archive
 at the Charley Project
 at the Doe Network

2000s missing person cases
2001 in Nebraska
June 2001 events in the United States
History of Omaha, Nebraska
Missing person cases in Nebraska